Richard Lancelot Deane Wodehouse (30 May 1892 – 20 May 1940) was an English cricketer. Born in Chippenham, Wiltshire, his entire recorded cricket career took place in Asia. He was one of three brothers of the author P. G. Wodehouse.

Wodehouse died in Cookham, Berkshire, in 1940, leaving a widow, Winifred Baker Wodehouse, and property valued at £1,920. His address at death was given as Woodlands, Cookham Dean.

Career

In April 1919, Wodehouse made his debut for the Straits Settlements, playing against the Federated Malay States in Singapore. The following year, he played twice for Hong Kong; against Malaya and a combined Shanghai/Malaya team.

He returned to play two more matches for the Straits Settlements against the Federated Malay States in 1922 and 1923, before playing three first-class matches in the Bombay Quadrangular tournament in India for the Europeans.

References

1892 births
1940 deaths
English cricketers
Europeans cricketers
People from Chippenham
Straits Settlements cricketers
Richard Wodehouse